Innogen Gengatharan, known professionally as Inno Genga, is a British playback singer who has worked in Tamil language films. After becoming noticed through his song covers on YouTube, Inno Genga has sung songs in albums composed by musicians including Anirudh Ravichander, D. Imman and Leon James.

Career
Innogen Gengatharan was born to Rajagopal and Chandrika Gengatharan on 8 November 1993. His parents immigrated from Sri Lanka. He was educated at Tiffin School, a grammar school in Kingston upon Thames in southwest London and later moved on to study Mathematics with Finance at the University of Southampton. During his time at university, he was able to raise his profile as a singer through appearances in shows arranged by the London Tamil diaspora and notably won the "Raise Your Voice" event organised by TSI & LSE Tamil Society in 2014. He also regularly made YouTube covers of RnB and Tamil songs under the stagename of Inno Genga, which won the notice of Tamil music composers.

Inno made his debut as a playback singer in the Tamil film industry through the song "Kannamma", a duet alongside Chinmayi, in the album for Ko 2 by Leon James. After his work on the film, he was invited by Anirudh Ravichander to be a part of his world tours as an opening artiste. Inno Genga then sang the song "Come Closer", a reprise version of "Sirikkadhey" in Anirudh's album for Remo (2016). As a result of his association in the film, he was also featured in the promotional video for the original song alongside other cast and crew members including Anirudh, Sivakarthikeyan and Keerthy Suresh. In 2017, Inno Genga notably sang in the albums for Theeran Adhigaaram Ondru (2017) and Gulaebaghavali (2018), with composers Ghibran and Vivek–Mervin.

In 2017, after graduating from university, Inno relocated to Chennai to continue to pursue his music career. His most high-profile work during the year was the baila song "Ullaalla" for Anirudh's soundtrack in the Rajinikanth-starrer, Petta (2019). Performing alongside Nakash Aziz, critics referred to the song as the "most fun song" of the album.

Discography
Singer

Composer

References

External links

1993 births
Living people
British male singer-songwriters
British people of Sri Lankan Tamil descent
People educated at Tiffin School
Sri Lankan Tamil musicians
Tamil playback singers
21st-century British singers
21st-century British male singers
Telugu playback singers